FRT is may refer to
 Facial recognition technology
Federally recognized tribe, in the United States
 Figure Reasoning Test
 Flippase recognition target
 Frant railway station, in England
 Free-radical theory
 Free return trajectory
 Frutillar Airport, in Chile
 Kiai language
 Romanian Tennis Federation